Sifangxi Township is an rural township in Sangzhi County, Zhangjiajie, Hunan Province, China.

Administrative division
The township is divided into 10 villages, the following areas: Hongjiayu Village, Dadongbao Village, Zhaigongping Village, Xiangshuidong Village, Sifangxi Village, Bajiaoya Village, Shecangping Village, Chayuanping Village, Tachangping Village, and Pingtouyan Village (洪家峪村、大洞包村、斋公坪村、响水洞村、四方溪村、芭蕉亚村、社仓坪村、茶元坪村、塔场坪村、平头岩村).

References

External links

Former towns and townships of Sangzhi County